Darch is a suburb of Perth, Western Australia, located within the City of Wanneroo approximately  north of the central business district. Previously part of Landsdale, much of the suburb was rural in character until the late 1990s. It was named after an early settler family in the area, with the name being approved in 1997. The area was subsequently opened to residential development, especially from 2001 onwards, as part of Cell 6 of the East Wanneroo Development Area.

Schools
Darch contains four schools – Ashdale Primary School, opened in 2005 with 243 pre-school and 596 primary students as of Semester 2, 2008; Kingsway Christian College, a non-denominational Christian school founded in 1983, initially known as Northern Districts Christian College; Landsdale Farm School, an education support school developed for students with disabilities; and Ashdale Secondary College, which opened in 2009 for the suburb's high school students, and is located on Westport Parade across from Ashdale Primary School and close to Kingsway Christian College.

The suburb contains several small residential parks as well as Landsdale Park, a bushland reserve with interpretative signage. Residents are served for shopping needs by the Darch Plaza shopping centre, and the larger Kingsway City Shopping Centre to the west.

The suburb is serviced by two Transperth bus routes, all operated by Swan Transit. The route 450, running along Kingsway, links to Warwick railway station; whilst the 374 route, which enters the suburb and serves the central section, travel via Evandale Road, links to Mirrabooka bus station and Whitfords railway station. All termini offer services to central Perth.

References

Suburbs of Perth, Western Australia
Suburbs of the City of Wanneroo